There are several chapels and churches dedicated to Our Lady Help of Christians 

 Our Lady Help of Christians Church, Portico, United Kingdom
 Our Lady Help of Christians Church, Luton, Bedfordshire, UK
 Our Lady Help of Christians and St Helen's Church, Westcliff-on-Sea, Essex, UK
 Our Lady Help of Christians Chapel (Cheektowaga, New York), United States
 Church of Our Lady Help of Christians (Staten Island, New York), United States